Çiftepınar (literally  "double fountain") is a village in Erdemli district of Mersin Province, Turkey. It lies along the west bank of Karakız creek. It was spun off from Pınarbaşı, a nearby  village, in 1954, and it makes up a larger conglomeration, along with both Pınarbaşı and Elvanlı, another village to the south. The population of Pınarbaşı is 957 as of 2012.
. The town was founded by a Turkmen tribe named Keşli Türkmen. The village economy depends agriculture and especially citrus farming.

References

Villages in Erdemli District